Scorțoasa is a commune in Buzău County, Muntenia, Romania. It is composed of eleven villages: Balta Tocila, Beciu, Dâlma, Deleni, Golu Grabicina, Grabicina de Jos, Grabicina de Sus, Gura Văii, Plopeasa, Policiori and Scorțoasa.

Notes

Communes in Buzău County
Localities in Muntenia